Ángeles Moreno Gómez (20 March 1935 - 16 December 2013), better known as Lolita Sevilla, was a Spanish actress and singer, whose career spanned over 40 years.

Born in Seville, she began singing at the age of ten, in 1945 and also had a film, television and stage acting career.

Lolita Sevilla died on 16 December 2013, aged 78, at the Hospital General Universitario Gregorio Marañón in Madrid.

References

External links

1935 births
2013 deaths
People from Seville
Actresses from Andalusia
Singers from Andalusia
Spanish television actresses
Spanish film actresses
Spanish stage actresses
20th-century Spanish actresses
21st-century Spanish actresses
20th-century Spanish musicians
20th-century Spanish women singers
20th-century Spanish singers